is a former Japanese football player.

Playing career
Furukawa was born in Chiba on 28 August 1968. After graduating from high school, he joined Honda in 1987. However he was not registered as a player until 1989. He could hardly play in the match and moved to Honda Luminozo Sayama in 1990. He left the club in June 1991 and moved to Brazil. After training in Brazil, he joined Kashima Antlers in 1992. He played as regular goalkeeper until 1994. From 1995, although he battles with Yohei Sato for the position, he could hardly play in the match behind Sato and Daijiro Takakuwa from 1997. He moved to Avispa Fukuoka in September 1998. Although he returned to Antlers in 1999, he could not play in the match. He retired end of 2000 season.

Club statistics

Manga
A 51-page manga story about Furukawa was published in Weekly Shōnen Sunday in 1994. It was called Furukawa Masaaki Monogatari – Kowareta Radio and it was illustrated by Yoshihiro Takahashi.

References

External links

Kawasaki Frontale 

1968 births
Living people
Association football people from Chiba Prefecture
Japanese footballers
Japan Soccer League players
J1 League players
Honda FC players
Kashima Antlers players
Avispa Fukuoka players
Association football goalkeepers